The Raus is a  tributary of the Birs in the Klus of Moutier.

Course 
The Raus rises at a spring at a height of  roughly northwest of Gänsbrunnen in the Swiss canton of Solothurn.

The Grand Rue runs along the Raus, the road between Moutier and Balsthal, whose branch near Gänsbrunnen leads to the Weissenstein Pass.

Catchment area 

The Raus flows through two Swiss cantons, Berne and Solothurn, and rises on the language boundary.

Rivers of the canton of Bern
Rivers of the canton of Solothurn
Rivers of Switzerland